Yaosang is a festival celebrated in Manipur for five days in spring, starting on the full moon day of the month of Lamda (February–March). Yaosang is indigenous traditions of the Meitei people. 
It is considered the most important festival in Manipur. But unlike Holi, the celebrations go far beyond just colours.

Description
Yaosang begins just after sunset in every village with the Yaosang Mei thaba, or Burning of the Straw Hut on the night of the fullmoon of Manipuri month of Lamta. Then the children ask at every house for monetary donations, called nakatheng. On the second day, groups of local bands perform sankirtan in the Govindagee Temple in the Imphal-East district of Manipur. On the second and third days, girls go to their relatives for their nakatheng and block roads with ropes for collecting money. On the fourth and fifth days, people pour or splash water on one another. A number of sport events like tug of war and soccer are also organised on this occasion. Apart from this, the local delicacies are also shared with the neighbours during the festival. 

Some recent trends during the festival of Yaoshang are music concerts, DJ and other forms of entertainment at open spaces. Local bands performs during such concerts.

Dance
Another feature of this festival is Thabal Chongba (Dancing in the Moonlight). Males from various places will come to the site of the festival and dance in circles with the females, holding their hands. In 2016, this occurred 23–24 March.

Celebrations
The locals also engage in feasting to celebrate this festival of merrymaking. Of late, there has been a trend of channelling the festive energy toward sporting events to spot out talents at the grassroot level, which is in line with the rich sporting spirit of the Meiteis.

Gallery

References
 

Festivals in Manipur
Religious festivals in India
Hindu festivals in India
March observances
Holi
Folk festivals in India
Sports festivals in India
Cultural festivals in India